"The Edge of Forever" is a song by The Dream Academy from their eponymous first album, released in 1985.

The song was only originally released as a promotional single. However, a brief excerpt was used under dialogue near the end of the 1986 film Ferris Bueller's Day Off. The song appears on the limited-edition soundtrack album released in 2016.

References

1985 singles
The Dream Academy songs
Songs written by Nick Laird-Clowes
1984 songs
Warner Records singles
Song recordings produced by David Gilmour